The Holy Trinity Column is installed in Malá Strana, Prague, Czech Republic.

See also

 Marian and Holy Trinity columns

External links
 

Buildings and structures in Prague
Malá Strana
Marian and Holy Trinity columns
Outdoor sculptures in Prague